Merycondontinae is a subfamily of pronghorn that arose during the middle of the Miocene and became extinct by the end of that period.
 
The Merycondontinae were small, slightly built, fast-running ungulates.  Both males and females were horned.

The genera Meryceros and Submeryceros are generally regarded as synonymous with Merycodus.

References

Byers, John A.; American Pronghorn: Social Adaptations & the Ghosts of Predators Past; University of Chicago Press; 1998

Prehistoric pronghorns